R&R Insurance Services is one of the largest independently owned insurance agencies in the Midwestern United States and represent national and regional insurance carriers.

The company was founded in 1976 and is based in Waukesha, Wisconsin. It is owned by Ken Riesch, who is also president of the company. It has 300 employees and $60 revenue in 2016.

It has expanded into other Southeastern Wisconsin communities including Beaver Dam, Fort Atkinson, Hartford, Menomonee Falls and West Bend. They were Small Business of the Year in 2002 by Small Business Times and listed as one of the Insurance Journal's Top 100 Independent Agencies in the nation.

Insurance companies of the United States
Financial services companies established in 1976
Companies based in Wisconsin
1976 establishments in Wisconsin